The Sovereign Award for Outstanding Owner is a Canadian Thoroughbred horse racing honor. Created in 1975 by the Jockey Club of Canada, it is part of the Sovereign Awards program and is awarded annually to the most successful owner of Thoroughbred horses racing in Canada.

Past winners: 
1975 : Jack H. Stafford
1976 : George R. Gardiner
1977 : Bory Margolus
1978 : Conn Smythe
1979 : Jimmy Shields
1980 : Ernie Samuel
1981 : Dave Kapchinsky
1982 : Kinghaven Farms
1983 : Bahnam K. Yousif
1984 : Ernie Samuel
1985 : Ernie Samuel
1986 : Kinghaven Farms
1987 : Kinghaven Farms
1988 : Ernie Samuel
1989 : Kinghaven Farms
1990 : Kinghaven Farms
1991 : Ernie Samuel
1992 : Steve Stavro
1993 : Frank Stronach
1994 : Frank Stronach
1995 : Frank Stronach
1996 : Minshall Farms

1997 : Frank Stronach
1998 : Stronach Stables
1999 : Stronach Stables
2000 : Sam-Son Farm
2001 : Sam-Son Farm
2002 : Stronach Stables
2003 : Stronach Stables
2004 : Sam-Son Farm
2005 : Stronach Stables
2006 : Sam-Son Farm 
2007 : Melnyk Racing Stables
2008 : Bear Stables, Ltd.
2009 : Melnyk Racing Stables
2010 : Sam-Son Farm 
2011 : Donver Stables, Glen Todd & Patrick Kinsella
2012 : John C. Oxley
2013 : John C. Oxley
2014 : John C. Oxley
2015 : Sam-Son Farm
2016 : Conquest Stables, LLC
2017: Chiefswood Stables Ltd.
2018: Chiefswood Stables Ltd.
2019 : Sam-Son Farm 
2020 : Live Oak Plantation

References
The Sovereign Awards at the Jockey Club of Canada website

Canadian racehorse owners and breeders
Horse racing awards
Horse racing in Canada